CFMX may refer to:
 CFMX-FM, a radio station in Cobourg, ON 
 CFMZ-FM, Toronto, which carried the CFMX-FM-2 call letters until September 2006. 
 CKFM-FM, a radio station in Toronto that briefly used the CFMX call letters between June 2007 and August 2007.